Winser is a surname. Notable people with the surname include:

Beatrice Winser (1869 – 1947) American librarian
Kim Winser (born 1959), Scottish businesswoman
Margaret Winser (1869 – 1944), English sculptor
Peter Winser (c. 1781 – 1865), Canadian merchant and politician